WZMT (93.3 FM) is a radio station licensed to Ponce, Puerto Rico, the station serves the Puerto Rico area.  The station is currently owned by Spanish Broadcasting System Holding Company, Inc.

References

External links
 

ZMT
Radio stations established in 1969
1969 establishments in Puerto Rico
Spanish Broadcasting System radio stations
ZMT